Infernal Runner is a horror-themed platform game for the Commodore 64 published by Loriciel in 1985 and later adapted to the Amstrad CPC. Game designer Eric Chahi, who later created Another World, is credited on the Amstrad version. Infernal Runner a flip screen game similar in style to Jet Set Willy: a series of platform-filled screens that can be moved between, each with specific obstacles to avoid.

Gameplay
Players find themselves trapped in a house with lethal traps and various other menaces, and they must escape alive by collecting all keys and opening all trunks, all while avoiding starvation by collecting food. It is unknown what the actual story is: after collecting enough items, a wall on the map will disappear and the player can escape the game, upon which the character is run over by an ambulance car and is carried offscreen on a stretcher.

Development
The C64 version is credited to Yves Korta and Michel Koell. The Amstrad version was created by Eric Chahi with music by Michel Winogradof.

References

External links
 Infernal Runner on Eric Chahi's personal site
 
 Infernal Runner at Loriciel's website

1985 video games
Amstrad CPC games
Commodore 64 games
Platform games
Single-player video games
Video games developed in France
Virtual Studio games